Malik Bentalha (born 1 March 1989 in Bagnols-sur-Cèze) is a French humorist and actor of Algerian and Moroccan descent. He does stand-up comedy and has appeared in some films.

Early life
Malik Bentalha studied at the Cours Florent during one year, from 2007 to 2008.

Career
In 2010, after Jamel Debbouze noticed him, Malik Bentalha integrated the Jamel Comedy Club and later on served as the opening act for Debbouze's tour, Tout sur Jamel, for two years. One day, he met Gad Elmaleh at Montmartre who asked him to do the opening act for his show at the Palais des Sports the following day. That same year, he was a part of Le meilleur de Paris fait sa comédie on France 2.

In 2014, he joined Cyril Hanouna in his radio program Les pieds dans le plat on Europe 1, with Valérie Bénaïm.

Since 2010, he has been touring with his first one man show, Malik Bentalha se la raconte, directed by Alex Lutz. In December 2014, a DVD was released. In January 2015, W9 broadcast a live session of the one man show, followed by a TV report, Malik se raconte.

In 2015, he is going to film Pattaya, a Franck Gastambide film in which he'll have one of the main roles.

He is a godfather for the Theodora Children's Charity.

Filmography

Television

Guest

References

External links

1981 births
French humorists
French people of Algerian descent
French people of Moroccan descent
French stand-up comedians
21st-century French male actors
People from Bagnols-sur-Cèze
Living people
Cours Florent alumni